Donjeux may refer to the following places in France:

 Donjeux, Haute-Marne, a commune in the Haute-Marne department
 Donjeux, Moselle, a commune in the Moselle department